Max Feagai (born 14 February 2001) is a professional rugby league footballer who plays as a er or  for the St. George Illawarra Dragons in the National Rugby League (NRL).

Background 
Feagai was born in Hastings, New Zealand, and is of Samoan and Tokelauan descent.
He has a twin brother, Mat Feagai, who also plays for the Dragons.

Career

Early career 
Feagai played his junior rugby league at the Leeton Greens in Group 20 Rugby League.

In 2019, he was selected for both the New South Wales Under-18's team and the Australian Schoolboys team after an impressive year where he won the 2019 S. G. Ball Cup with the Illawarra Steelers.

2020 
Feagai made his debut for St. George Illawarra in their 42–18 loss against Newcastle in round 19 of the 2020 NRL season.

2021
Feagai was limited to only four appearances in the 2021 NRL season which saw St. George Illawarra finish 11th and miss out on the finals.

Statistics

References

External links 
 Dragons profile

2001 births
New Zealand rugby league players
New Zealand sportspeople of Samoan descent
New Zealand people of Tokelauan descent
Rugby league centres
St. George Illawarra Dragons players
People from Hastings, New Zealand
Living people